Supervivientes 2011: Perdidos en Honduras, was the eighth season of the show Supervivientes and the twelve season of Survivor to air in Spain and it was broadcast on Telecinco from May 5, 2011 to July 28, 2011. For this year the show returned to Honduras for the fourth time. For this season, Jorge Javier Vázquez acted as the main host at the central studio in Madrid, with Raquel Sánchez Silva co-hosting from the island, and Christian Gálvez hosting a side debate of the program. The main twist this season was that of "Purgatory"; beginning with the first elimination and continuing through the fifth elimination, many of the eliminated contestants were sent to Purgatory following their elimination. Once in Purgatory they would live with the Anonymous contestants. This twist came to an end on Day 32 when the contestants living there all faced a public vote to determine who'd return to the game. Ultimately, it was Rosa Benito who won this season over Rosa María "Rosi" Arcas and Tatiana Delgado.

Finishing order

Nominations

External links
http://www.telecinco.es/supervivientes/

Survivor Spain seasons